Snow or Snowe is an English surname.

Notable people with the surname include:
 Al Snow (born 1963), American professional wrestler
 Adam Snow, American polo player
 Aurora Snow, American porn star
 Barbara Snow (ornithologist) (1921–2007), English ornithologist
 Barbara Snow (therapist), American therapist
 Ben Snow, Australian special effects artist
 Brittany Snow (born 1986), American film and television actress
 C. P. Snow (1905–1980), British physicist and novelist
 Chester Snow (1881–1970), American applied mathematician and physicist
 Dan Snow (born 1978), British presenter
 Dash Snow (1981–2009), American visual artist
 Dave Snow, American college baseball coach
 David Snow (disambiguation)
 Derick Snow, American voice actor
 Don Snow (born 1957), British musician
 Edgar Snow (1905–1972), American journalist
 Edwin Snowe (born 1970), Liberian politician and former Speaker of the Liberian House of Representatives
 Eric Snow (born 1973), American basketball coach and player
 Eric Snow (rugby union) (1898–1974), New Zealand rugby union player
 Ernest A. Snow (1876–1927), American jurist
 Francis H. Snow (1840–1908), American academic
 Garth Snow (born 1969), American hockey player
 Hank Snow (1914–1999), American country singer
 J. T. Snow (born 1968), American baseball player
 Jack Snow (writer) (1907–1956), writer of Oz books
 Jack Snow (American football) (1943–2006), American football player
 J. T. Snow (Jack Thomas, born 1968), American baseball player and son of the football player
 John Snow (cricketer) (born 1941), English cricketer
 John J. Snow Jr. (born 1945), American politician, former member of the North Carolina Senate
 John James Snow Jr. (born 1929), American politician, former member of the South Carolina House of Representatives
 John W. Snow (born 1939), American politician, 73rd United States Secretary of the Treasury
 Jon Snow (journalist) (born 1947), British journalist and news presenter
 Julia Warner Snow (1863–1927), American botanist
 Kate Snow (born 1969), American television journalist and correspondent
 Lois Snowe-Mello (1948–2016), American politician
 Lorenzo Snow (1814–1901), fifth President of The Church of Jesus Christ of Latter-day Saints
 Mark Snow (born 1946), American soundtrack composer 
 Mary McCarty Snow (1928–2012), American electronic music composer 
 Michael Snow (1928–2023), Canadian artist
 Olympia Snowe (born 1947), United States Senator from Maine
 Paul Snow-Hansen (born 1990), New Zealand sailor
 Peter Snow (disambiguation)
 Peter Snowe (1943–1973), American politician
 Phoebe Snow (1950–2011), American singer-songwriter
 Reuben L. Snowe (1866–1942), American politician
 Rod Snow, Canadian rugby player
 Sydney Snow (1887–1958), Australian businessman and politician
 Thomas Snow (disambiguation)
 Tom Snow (born 1947), American songwriter
 Tony Snow (1955–2008), American television news anchor and White House Press Secretary
 Valaida Snow (1904–1956), American jazz musician
 William Snow (disambiguation)

Fictional characters 
 Chrissy Snow, on the television show Three's Company
 Coriolanus Snow, in The Hunger Games franchise
 Elijah Snow, in the comic book Planetary
 Jon Snow (character), in the novel series A Song of Ice and Fire
 Ramsay Snow, in the novel series A Song of Ice and Fire

English-language surnames